Dirk Sadowicz (born 25 February 1965) is a retired German football defender.

References

External links
 

1965 births
Living people
German footballers
Bundesliga players
Oberliga (football) players
Landesliga players
VfL Bochum II players
VfL Bochum players
SC Paderborn 07 players
DSC Wanne-Eickel players
STV Horst-Emscher players
Place of birth missing (living people)
Association football defenders